The Danube Commission is concerned with the maintenance and improvement of navigation conditions of the Danube River, from its source in Germany to its outlets in Romania and Ukraine, leading to the Black Sea. It was established in 1948 by seven countries bordering the river, replacing previous commissions that had also included representatives of non-riparian powers. Its predecessor commissions were among the first attempts at internationalizing the police powers of sovereign states for a common cause.

Members include representatives from Austria, Bulgaria, Croatia, Germany, Hungary, Moldova, Serbia, Slovakia, Romania, Russia and Ukraine.

The commission dates to the Paris Conferences of 1856, which established for the first time an international regime to safeguard free navigation on the Danube, and of 1921, which resurrected the international regime after the First World War.

Duties

The commission meets regularly twice a year. It also convenes groups of experts to consider items provided for in the commission's working plans.

Its primary duties are:

Supervising the implementation of the international convention that set it up in 1948.
Preparing a general plan of the main works called for in the interest of navigation.
Consulting with and making recommendations to the special administrations charged with various stretches of the river and exchanging information with them.
Establishing a uniform system of traffic regulations on the whole navigable portion of the Danube and, taking into account the specific conditions of various sections of the river, laying down the basic provisions governing navigation on the Danube, including those governing a pilot service.
Unifying the regulations governing river, customs and sanitary inspection.
Harmonizing regulations on inland navigation with the European Union and with the Central Commission for Navigation on the Rhine.
Coordinating the activity of hydro-meteorological services on the Danube and publishing short-term and long-term hydrologic forecasts for the river.
Collecting statistical data on aspects of navigation on the Danube within the commission's competence.
Publishing reference works, sailing directions, nautical charts and atlases for purposes of navigation.

Organization
The commission elects from among its members a president, vice-president and secretary for three-year terms. Serving since 2008 are Igor Savolsky of the Russian Federation, Ernő Keskeny of Hungary, and Dmytro Tkach of Ukraine. The commission has a secretariat  of 11 international civil servants and 19 employees under the supervision of a director-general, who is at present Manfred Seitz from Austria.

The official languages of the commission are German, French and Russian.

History

As a result of the Danube River Conference of 1948, the river system was divided into three administrations: the regular River Commission (which had existed in one form or another since 1856), a bilateral Romania–USSR administration between Brăila and the mouth of the Sulina channel, and a bilateral Romania–Yugoslavia administration at the Iron Gate. Both of the latter were technically under the control of the main commission, members of which were – at the beginning – Bulgaria, Czechoslovakia, Hungary, Romania, Ukraine, the USSR, and Yugoslavia.

The Cominform rift

When the treaty was adopted, Yugoslavia had already been expelled from the Cominform, the political grouping of all the Communist parties in the Soviet bloc. Yet it still voted down the line with the other non-Western countries, nearly 200 miles of the Danube flowing through its territory and the only navigable channel through the Iron Gate being on the Yugoslav side of the Romanian border. Nevertheless, when the new commission organized its staff, the Yugoslavs were offered only four minor posts out of sixty permanent appointments. The Josip Broz Tito government refused them all.

The commission also fixed freight rates that allegedly discriminated against Yugoslavia, Belgrade officials said. Faced with this situation,

the Yugoslav delegate to the commission has been most uncooperative. He has been a minority of one on every major question that has come up for discussion. He opposed, for example, the creation of a special administration fluviale [river administration] run by a joint Czechoslovak–Hungarian Commission to control the difficult Gabcikovo–Gunyu sector… The Yugoslavs lost by six votes to one. But they have at least got their own back by refusing to pay their share of the commission's expenses.

Another report, however, stated that it was the commission itself that "had made a determined effort to avoid accepting Yugoslavia's share in the expenses," which were even larger than the Yugoslav contribution to the United Nations.

These grievances were compounded by the vast powers wielded by the Soviet Union. At the session of November 11, 1949, a Soviet proposal was adopted vesting complete powers of appointment, organization, leadership, and negotiation in the secretary, who was the Russian representative. By 1950,

the Soviet government [had] assumed complete control over the Commission's administrative machinery and reduced the other governments to nominal status… Yugoslav representatives [had] been excluded from every important committee.

At the May 1951 meeting, the Yugoslavs walked out, forcing adjournment. They were protesting the "railroading" of shipping regulations they thought would hurt their economy: a rule forbidding inspection of foreign ships by the nations through which they were passing. The Yugoslavs charged sabotage and infiltration by Soviet agents aboard the ships. In August, Yugoslavia told the USSR in a note that the commission's rules were "contrary in letter and spirit" to the 1948 convention, giving the Soviets control of the waterway in violation of national sovereignty.

At the commission's fifth session, in June 1952, Yugoslavia proposed the establishment of an executive committee to be composed of one representative from each country; it would control business between formal sessions of the commission. The Soviet bloc voted to study the plan "sometime between the sixth and seventh sessions." Next, Yugoslavia proposed that the top posts should be rotated among the six members every three years, but the commission rejected that suggestion in June 1953. Rumors sprang up that Yugoslavia would resign from the commission because of this treatment.

Slowly, though, the picture changed with a thaw in Yugoslav–Soviet relations. On December 15, 1953, Dragoje Djuric, a Yugoslav diplomat, was elected to the secretary's post, a Hungarian was named president and a Bulgarian vice president. A Belgrade spokesman said in glee that the sessions were unusually harmonious because the Iron Curtain countries were agreeing to "all proposals put on the agenda by the Yugoslavs," one of them being a Yugoslav–Hungarian proposal to move the commission's headquarters from Galatz to Budapest.

Later, though, the Soviet bloc intimated the downgrading of the Danube Commission. A Vienna dispatch reported that the Council for Mutual Economic Assistance, the Eastern European equivalent of the Marshall Plan, had created a new, permanent Danube committee of its own, its purpose to draft measures for using Danube water for power, irrigation, and navigation. It ordered at a Moscow meeting that plans be made to raise the level of the river by dams so seagoing ships could move farther upstream.

East–west detente

The Danube Commission was seen as a bridge between East and West. Czechoslovak researcher Juraj Cuth wrote in 1960 that the Danube Commission, "has become an important center of close cooperation of all the riparian states… It has turned into a forum of cooperation between representatives of socialist and capitalist states."

Future plans

The commission has announced an intention to modernize by extending its powers and functions and admitting new members, following the conclusion of an ongoing revision of the 1948 convention. France, Turkey and the European Union have declared they want to become members.

See also

A series of articles on this subject in chronological order
Internationalization of the Danube River, for events from earliest times to the Treaty of Paris in 1856
Commissions of the Danube River, for the international body governing the waterway from 1856 to 1940
Nazi rule over the Danube River, for events during World War II
Danube River Conference of 1948
International Commission for the Protection of the Danube River, for the organization established in 1998 and charged with environmental and ecological activities

References and notes

External links
Website of the Danube Commission
The treaty 
Summary history of the Danube River commissions, 1856–1948, by Edgar Martin. Includes a photograph of a Danube River Commission medal dated 1931.

Danube
Foreign relations of the Soviet Union
International organizations based in Europe
Soviet Union–Yugoslavia relations
Inland waterway authorities